The Gloria Dei Evangelical Lutheran Church is an historic church at 15 Hayes Street in Providence, Rhode Island.  The single-story brick structure was designed by Martin Hedmark, and built in 1925-28 for a predominantly Scandinavian congregation established in 1890.  The brick is laid in patterns, and the tower features a stepped gable roof.  The corners of the main facade have small turrets, one topped with a lantern spire, the other with a needle.  The design includes vernacular elements of Swedish architecture, a feature not generally found in the area. Originally, the church was built for a Swedish congregation, but today accepts many other nationalities and cultures, including Angola, Liberia, Tanzania, Portugal, Germany, Haiti, Jamaica, Britain, Bolivia,  Dominican Republic, Guatemala, Mexico, and numerous others.

The church was listed on the National Register of Historic Places in 1984.

See also
National Register of Historic Places listings in Providence, Rhode Island

References

External links
Gloria Dei Evangelical Lutheran Church website

Lutheran churches in Rhode Island
Churches on the National Register of Historic Places in Rhode Island
National Register of Historic Places in Providence, Rhode Island